The Pacific Mini Games  is a continental multi-sport event contested by countries and territories located in Oceania. The event has been held every four years since the inaugural games in Honiara, Solomon Islands in 1981. It was known as the South Pacific Mini Games prior to 2009. It is called the 'Mini' games because it is a scaled-down version of the main Pacific Games and is similarly rotated on a four-year basis in the intervening years between the main Games.

The Mini Games have been hosted by 9 different Pacific Island capitals around 4 countries and 5 territories. Only the Cook Islands and Vanuatu have hosted twice, with Palau set to host the event for the second time in 2025. Similarly to the main Games, athletes with a disability are included as full members of their national teams. In each sporting event, gold medals are awarded for first place, silver medals are awarded for second place, and bronze medals are awarded for third place.

Unlike the main Games, there is equal dominance from Pacific Games associations (PGA's). Papua New Guinea, New Caledonia, and Fiji have all ranked first a record 3 times each with Samoa and Nauru topping a games once.

Concept
Following the success of the main Pacific Games, the Pacific Games council decided to create a smaller version of the games to enable smaller nations and territories to host events and compete against each other. From this came the Pacific Mini Games.

Pacific Games Council 

The governing body for the mini games is the Pacific Games Council. Much like the main games, the Games council flag is presented to the host nation of the next mini games at the end of every games. As of 2017, the council has 22 member nations. 

Two other nations, Australia and New Zealand, are not members of the council but are invited  as observers to the council's general assembly. These nations participated at the mini games in 2017 and made their main games debut in 2015.

Editions

List of Pacific Mini Games

As with the main games, the cost of providing the necessary facilities and infrastructure is a concern to the region's smaller nations. In preparation for the 2009 Games in Rarotonga, despite having hosted the games previously, the local government considered diverting funds from a highway project, and secured a loan for US$10 million from the Chinese government to finance the building of a stadium.

Sports

There are 37 approved sports by the Pacific Games Council updated in 2019. Unlike the main games,  the Pacific Mini Games does not have a compulsory sports list. However,  50 percent of the sports selected for a games must be from the compulsory sports list of the Pacific Games Council.

After the 2022 Games in Saipan,  29 of the 37 sports have been included at the Mini Games since the inaugural edition in 1981.

Listed are sports already contested at the Pacific Mini Games.

Former sports
Both disciplines have been replaced by other versions of the sports. Rugby 15s (replaced by Rugby 7s), and Rugby league 7s (replaced by Rugby league 9s).

All-time medal table
This table shows all medals won by a Pacific Games association since the inaugural games in 1981 to the most recent games held in 2022.

See also
 Pacific Games

References

Sources

Recurring sporting events established in 1981